Dibernardia bilineata is a species of snake in the family Colubridae. The species is native to Brazil.

References

Dibernardia
Snakes of South America
Reptiles described in 1885
Endemic fauna of Brazil
Reptiles of Brazil]